The 2010–11 NBB season was the third season of Novo Basquete Brasil, the Brazilian basketball league. It started on October 29, 2010, and was disputed by fourteen teams playing each other in round and runoff in the regular season. The NBB serves as a qualifying competition for international tournaments such as FIBA Americas League, Liga Sudamericana and Torneo InterLigas. As in the second edition, in the third edition of NBB, also named NBB 3, At the end of the regular season the first four teams qualify for the quarterfinals of the playoffs automatically now the team who finish between 5° and 12° positions will participate in the first round of the playoffs o define the other four teams in the quarterfinals.

Participating teams 
 Franca
 Paulistano
 Araraquara
 Assis Basket
 Bauru
 São José
 Pinheiros
 Winner Limeira
 Flamengo
 Vitória Basquete/CECRE
 CETAF Vila Velha
 Brasília
 Joinville
 Minas
 Uberlândia

Regular season 

Classification

Playoffs- first round

Bauru (5) vs. (12) Paulistano

Game 1

Game 2

Game 3

Uberlândia (6) vs. (11) Araraquara

Game 1

Game 2

Game 3

Joinville (7) vs. (10) Minas

Game 1

Game 2

Game 3

Game 4

Game 5

São José (8) vs. (9) Limeira

Game 1

Game 2

Game 3

Game 4

Game 5

Playoffs

Quarterfinals

Franca (1) vs. (8) São José

Game 1

Game 2

Game 3

Pinheiros (2) vs. (7) Joinville

Game 1

Game 2

Game 3

Game 4

Game 5

Brasília (3) vs. (6) Uberlândia

Game 1

Game 2

Game 3

Game 4

Game 5

Flamengo (4) vs. (5) Bauru

Game 1

Game 2

Game 3

Game 4

Semifinals

Franca (1) vs. (4) Flamengo

Game 1

Game 2

Game 3

Pinheiros (2) vs. (3) Brasília

Game 1

Game 2

Game 3

Game 4

Finals

Franca (1) vs. (3) Brasília

Game 1

Game 2

Game 3

Game 4

Awards 
 MVP - Guilherme Giovannoni (Brasília)
 Finals MVP - Guilherme Giovannoni (Brasília)
 Sixth Player - Vítor Benite (Franca)
 Best Defender - Alex Garcia (Brasília)
 Revelation - Vítor Benite (Franca)
 Most Improved Player - Vítor Benite (Franca)
 Coach - Hélio Rubens (Franca)

All-Team

References 

Novo Basquete Brasil seasons
NBB
Brazil